Vincent Laresca (born January 21, 1974) is an American actor.

Laresca is of Panamanian and Italian descent. He first appeared in film in the 1992 movie Juice, as Radames. Since then, he has appeared in many popular films, including The Devil's Advocate, The Aviator, Empire, Coach Carter, The Fast and the Furious: Tokyo Drift and Baz Luhrmann's William Shakespeare's Romeo + Juliet.

In 1997, he had a supporting role in the short-lived Fox ensemble drama 413 Hope St.  He has also had major supporting roles on 24, CSI: Miami and Weeds. In 2013 Laresca took on a role as a Mexican federale and the hit man Jangles in the show Graceland.

In 2016, Laresca had a main role in NBC's Shades of Blue as NYPD Detective Carlos Espada.

Filmography
 1992 Juice as Radames
 1992 Bad Lieutenant as J.C.
 1994 I Like It Like That as Angel
 1995 Money Train as Subway Robber #1
 1996 The Substitute as Rodriguez
 1996 Basquiat as Vincent
 1996 Ripe as Jimmy
 1996 Extreme Measures as Patches
 1996 The Associate as José, Plaza Waiter
 1996 William Shakespeare's Romeo + Juliet as Abra
 1996 I'm Not Rappaport as Renaldo
 1997 Arresting Gena as Bopo
 1997 Cop Land as Medic #2
 1997 The Real Blonde as Trey
 1997 The Devil's Advocate as Big Guy #1
 1998 Music from Another Room as Jesus
 1999 Forever Mine as Javier Cesti
 1999 Just One Time as Nick
 1999 Flawless as Raymond Camacho
 2000 Animal Factory as Ernie
 2000 Before Night Falls as Jose Abreu
 2001 K-PAX as Navarro
 2002 Empire as Jimmy
 2002 Hard Cash as Nikita
 2003 Hollywood Homicide as Correction Officer Rodriguez
 2004 The Aviator as Jorge
 2005 Coach Carter as Renny 
 2005 Kiss Kiss Bang Bang as Aurelio
 2005 Law & Order: Criminal Intent (TV series) as Antonio Morales
 2005 Lords of Dogtown as Chino
 2006 The Fast and the Furious: Tokyo Drift as Case Worker
 2006 El Cantante as Ralph
 2006 CSI: Miami (TV series) as Antonio Riaz
 2006 .45 as Jose
 2006 TV: The Movie as Jose Carlos, Drug Lord
 2007 Gardener of Eden as Pavon
 2007 CSI: Crime Scene Investigation (TV series) as Gino Aquino
 2008 Drillbit Taylor as Fence
 2008 The Longshots as Pop Warner Official #1
 2008 Lakeview Terrace as Second Officer
 2009 CSI: NY (TV series) as Al Santiago
 2010 Unthinkable as Agent Leandro
 2010 Devil as Henry
 2011 Person of Interest (TV series) as Detective Molina
 2011 Gun Hill Road as Hector
 2012 The Amazing Spider-Man as Construction Worker
 2013 Runner Runner as Sergeant Barrancas
 2014 Asthma as Painter
 2015 Hot Pursuit as Felipe Riva
 2019 Once Upon a Time in Hollywood as Land Pirate

References

External links

1974 births
American male film actors
American male television actors
Living people
Male actors from New York City
20th-century American male actors
21st-century American male actors